Magic Island is an island (now connected to the mainland) in the Kanawha River near its confluence with the Elk River in Charleston, West Virginia. Kanawha Boulevard separates Magic Island from Charleston's West Side neighborhood. It serves as a public park for the city.
The island gained its name due to the rise and fall of the river level in the Kanawha, which caused the island to slip underwater, as if by "magic".

The sandy area towards the easternmost tip of the park is known unofficially as Rockaway Beach to many of the local park revelers.

See also 
List of islands of West Virginia

Geography of Charleston, West Virginia
Islands of Kanawha County, West Virginia
Kanawha River
River islands of West Virginia
Municipal parks in West Virginia
Protected areas of Kanawha County, West Virginia